Swadlincote railway station was a station that served the town of Swadlincote, South Derbyshire. The station was located off Midland Road near the present day fire station which now occupies the station site. There is also a new build housing estate nearby called "Old Railway Mews".

Opening
The first station to serve Swadlincote was in the nearby Castle Gresley settlement quite a distance from the town. This section was authorised under the Midland Railway (Leicester and Swannington Alteration) Act of 1846 and although recorded as opening to passengers in 1851 much of the line had been completed by as early as September 1849.

Usage
The line was more for industrial use for the local mines and collieries but was also used for passenger services with stations at both  and Swadlincote.

Closure
The line suffered from the effects of the Second World War, and as a result regular passenger services were withdrawn from the line in 1947, but Summer Saturday service to Blackpool continued until 8 September 1962. The line remained in use for industrial traffic until 1964 when the line was closed and dismantled in 1965.

Present day
Swadlincote railway station site is now occupied by a fire station. The trackbed towards Woodville now a retail park and towards Burton is mostly intact.

Map

References

Disused railway stations in Derbyshire
Former Midland Railway stations
Railway stations in Great Britain opened in 1851
Railway stations in Great Britain closed in 1947
Swadlincote